Sơn Động is a rural district of Bắc Giang province in the Northeast region of Vietnam. It is the easternmost district in the province. As of 2018 it had a population of 72,350. The district covers an area of 844 km². The district capital lies at An Châu.   There are some cultural sites here such as: Chẽ pagoda, Female King temple, Lục Liễu temple, Đặng temple and Chẽ temple.

Administrative divisions
The district is divided administratively into two townships, An Châu (district capital) and Tây Yên Tử, and the communes of: Hữu Sản, An Lạc, Vân Sơn, Lệ Viễn, Vĩnh An, Dương Hưu, Long Sơn, An Bá, Yên Định, Tuấn Đạo, Thanh Luận, Cẩm Đàn, Giáo Liêm, Đại Sơn and Phúc Sơn.

121.72 km² in the southern portion of the district has been designated as the Tây Yên Tử Nature Reserve.

References

Districts of Bắc Giang province